Clarence Johnston (born 1924-2018)—also credited as Clarence Johnson—was a jazz drummer. He was born in Boston.

He appears on several mid-1950s recordings by James Moody and early 1960s albums by vocalist Joe Williams, by sax player Jimmy Forrest and by organist Freddie Roach, including the latter's debut on the Blue Note label, Down to Earth (1962). In the second half of the 1970s he appears on three Sonny Stitt albums.

Discography 

 1954 (recorded September): Moody - James Moody And His Band (Prestige)
 1954 (recorded September) James Moody's Moods - James Moody, Dave Burns, William Shepherd, Pee Wee Moore, Jimmy Boyd, John Lathan, Clarence Johnson (Prestige)
 1955: Hi Fi Party - James Moody, Dave Burns, William Shepherd, Pee Wee Moore, Jimmy Boyd, John Lathan, Clarence Johnson, Eddie Jefferson (Prestige)
 1955: Wail, Moody, Wail - James Moody, Dave Burns, William Shepherd, Pee Wee Moore, Jimmy Boyd, John Lathan, Clarence Johnson (Prestige)
 1956: Flute 'n the Blues - James Moody, Johnny Coles, William Shepherd, Pee Wee Moore, Jimmy Boyd, John Lathan, Clarence Johnson, Eddie Jefferson (Argo)
 1959 (recorded August): James Moody - James Moody, Johnny Coles, Tom McIntosh, Musa Kaliem, Gene Kee, John Lathan, Clarence Johnston (Argo Records)
 1959 (recorded December) Hey! It's James Moody - James Moody, Johnny Gray, Eldee Young, Clarence Johnston, Eddie Jefferson (Argo Records)
 1961: Together - Joe Williams, Harry "Sweets" Edison, Jimmy Forrest, "Sir" Charles Thompson, Tommy Potter, Clarence Johnston (Roulette Records)
 1961 (recorded April): Out of the Forrest - Jimmy Forrest, Clarence Johnston, Joe Zawinul and Tommy Potter (Prestige)
 1961 (recorded September): Sit Down and Relax with Jimmy Forrest''' - Jimmy Forrest, Hugh Lawson, Calvin Newborn, Tommy Potter, Clarence Johnston (Prestige)
 1961 (recorded October): Most Much! - Jimmy Forrest, Hugh Lawson, Tommy Potter, Clarence Johnston, Ray Barretto.
 1962: Jawbreakers - Eddie "Lockjaw" Davis, Harry "Sweets" Edison, Hugh Lawson, Ike Isaacs, Clarence Johnston (Riverside Records)
 1962: Down to Earth - Freddie Roach, Percy France, Kenny Burrell, Clarence Johnston (Blue Note)
 1962: Wanted to Do One Together (also released as Ben and "Sweets") - Ben Webster, Harry "Sweets" Edison, Hank Jones, George Duvivier, Clarence Johnson (Columbia Records)
 1963: Mo' Greens Please - Freddie Roach, Kenny Burrell, Clarence Johnston, Conrad Lester (Blue Note)
 1963: Never Let Me Go - Stanley Turrentine, Shirley Scott, Sam Jones, Clarence Johnston (Blue Note)
 1964: Good Move! - Freddie Roach, Eddie Wright, Blue Mitchell, Hank Mobley, Clarence Johnston (Blue Note)
 1964: Brown Sugar - Freddie Roach, Eddie Wright, Joe Henderson, Clarence Johnston (Blue Note)
 1965: All That's Good - Freddie Roach, Conrad Lester, Calvin Newborn, Clarence Johnston, Marvin Robinson, Phyllis Smith, Willie Tate (Blue Note)
 1967: Extension - George Braith, Billy Gardner, Grant Green, Clarence Johnston (Blue Note)
 1976: Forecast: Sonny & Red - Sonny Stitt, Red Holloway, Art Hillery, Larry Gales, Clarence Johnston (Catalyst)
 1976: I Remember Bird - Sonny Stitt, Frank Rosolino, Dolo Coker, Allen Jackson, Clarence Johnston
 1977: Sonny Stitt with Strings: A Tribute to Duke Ellington - Sonny Stitt, Gildo Mahones, Allen Jackson, Clarence Johnston, string section arranged and conducted by Bill Finegan (Catalyst)
 1979: A Woman Knows'' - Lorez Alexandria, Jack Wilson, Charles Owens, Brian Atkinson, Rick Zurtigar, Allen Jackson, Clarence Johnston (Discovery)

References 

1934 births
Living people
American male jazz musicians
American jazz drummers